Józef Franciszek Szawara (1902 – 5 August 1944) was a Polish rower. He competed in the men's coxed four event at the 1924 Summer Olympics. He was killed during the Warsaw Uprising.

References

External links
 

1902 births
1944 deaths
Polish male rowers
Olympic rowers of Poland
Rowers at the 1924 Summer Olympics
People from Mińsk Mazowiecki
Polish civilians killed in World War II
Warsaw Uprising insurgents
Resistance members killed by Nazi Germany